The Kharkiv supermarket bombings took place around noon on 22 April 2006 in the Ukrainian city of Kharkiv.  Two homemade bombs exploded in supermarkets about one kilometer apart.  the first bomb blast bast occurred in the YuSI supermarket injuring at least two people eight minutes later the second bomb blast occurred in the Silpo supermarket (still exists) injuring at least six people. The bomb blasts were organized by two people. The two criminals tried to use the bombs as a form of  blackmailing to get 50,000 USD out of each supermarket, at least one of the people involved were arrested.

References

Attacks on supermarkets
History of Kharkiv
Terrorist incidents in Europe in 2006
Terrorist incidents in Ukraine in the 2000s
2006 crimes in Ukraine
Building bombings in Europe
2000s in Kharkiv